Rabbi Barry Silver (born November 18, 1956) is a Florida attorney and politician who served as a member of the Florida House of Representatives.

Early life and education 
Silver was born to Elaine and Samuel Silver in Mount Vernon, New York on November 18, 1956.

He graduated with honors from Florida Atlantic University in 1979, and received his juris doctor from Nova University in 1983.

Career 
Silver was granted admission to The Florida Bar in 1983.

Silver came in first in the primary election held on September 2, 1996, to replace Ron Klein in Florida House of Representatives District 89. In October, Silver won the Democratic nomination for the runoff election over Glenn Wichinsky.  Because there was no Republican opposition, by winning the runoff, Silver essentially won the District 89 Seat.

In June 2022, Silver filed a lawsuit against a Florida law banning abortions after 15 weeks, on the grounds that the law infringed on the constitution's right to freedom of religion, among other legal entitlements.

Silver has led Congregation L'Dor Va-Dor in Palm Beach County since 1996.

Notes

Sources
 Florida House of Representatives archived Profile

External links
 Website of Representative Barry Silver

1956 births
Democratic Party members of the Florida House of Representatives
Florida Atlantic University alumni
People from Boca Raton, Florida
Living people
Politicians from Mount Vernon, New York